Felefeber - Norwegian Fiddle Fantasia (released 1994 by the Norwegian Grappa label - GRCD 4081) is a studio album by Annbjørg Lien. The album was recorded in Gjerpen Church near Skien, a stone church from the 12th century. Only the sounds of the fiddle, guitar and church organ were recorded.

Track listing 
«Tjønneblomen» / «The Water Lily» (3:32) (Gjermund Haugen)
«Halling Etter Mosafinn» / «Halling After Ola Mosafinn» (2:41) (Traditional)
«Springar Etter Kristiane Lund» / «Springar After Kristiane Lund» (3:36) (Traditional)
«Felefeber» / «Fiddle Fever/Fiddlemania» (5:11) (Annbjørg Lien)
«Droneslaget» / «The Battle of the Drones» (4:12) (Annbjørg Lien)
«Den Bortkomne Sauen» / «The Lost Sheep» (3:19) (Traditional)
«Knepphallingen» / «The Plucked Halling» (4:11) (Jon Rosenlind)
«Elgskyttaren» / «The Moose Hunter» (3:06) (Traditional)
«Et Lite Barn» / «A Little Child» (5:48) (Traditional)
«Dragos» (4:15) (Roger Tallroth)
«Nordfjordhallingen» / «The Nordfjord Halling» (3:47) (Traditional)
«Hildalen» / «The Hildale Man» (3:23) (Traditional)
«Amen» (3:35) (Traditional/Nils Brorson)
«Myllargutens Bruremarsj» / «The Miller Boy's Bridal March» (2:46) (Torgeir Audgundson)

Personnel 
Annbjørg Lien – Hardingfele
Iver Kleive – pipe organ
Steinar Ofsdal – flute
Roger Tallroth – bass balalaika, guitar & octave mandolin

Credits 
Arranger - Iver Kleive
Producer & arranger – Annbjørg Lien
Producer, arranger & programming – Roger Tallroth
Digital mastering - Robert Vosgien

References 

Annbjørg Lien albums
1994 live albums